Imonggo is a free Cloud-based POS for small businesses. Released by international tech company Movmento Pte. Ltd. in 2009, it was the first free web-based POS system available for small business. Imonggo can be used on macOS as it is configured for Safari and also supports all other major Internet browsers such as Internet Explorer, Firefox, and Google Chrome.

Release

Imonggo version 2.0 was first launched in 2009 by Movmento Pte. Ltd.. Movmento is a SaaS company with its headquarters in Singapore. They have sales and marketing divisions in the United States and their research and development teams are located in the Philippines.

Imonggo released its iPad app on January 4, 2013. The app allows users to sell items offline, and to use their iPad tablets to showcase their products to customers.

Features

Imonggo is not a downloadable software. Users must create an account online which can then be accessed from anywhere there is an Internet connection. Imonggo is configured as a POS system as well as a web-based retail management solution. It allows retailers to manage hundreds of stores and inventory as well as providing sales analysis and business intelligence. Imonggo allows stores to create multiple users as well as business subsidiaries. The software also has a hack-proof SSL encryption to protect data. It also uses several servers in different geographical areas to back up data in order to ensure that no business data for a company is lost or destroyed. The software can also support peripherals such as barcode scanners, label printers, cash drawers, check readers, receipt printers and signature capture pads.

Partnerships
Imonggo is partnered with Authorize.Net for credit card processing. It is also a software partner of Star Micronics Co., Ltd.

Awards and recognitions 

Imonggo was awarded with the Best Business Software Award in the Point of Sales Software category by APEX in 2009. In 2011, they were also listed as one of the top 90 cloud computing companies to watch.

References

Cloud applications
Point of sale companies